Brad M. Edelman (born September 3, 1960) is a former American football guard in the National Football League (NFL) for the New Orleans Saints. Edelman played college football at the University of Missouri.

Biography
Edelman was born in Jacksonville, Florida, and is Jewish. Edelman played college football at the University of Missouri. He played 90 games of American football at guard in the National Football League for the New Orleans Saints from 1982 to 1989.

His current occupation is photographer, and he currently resides in New Orleans' French Quarter. He also does sports analysis for WDSU-TV in New Orleans.

He was inducted into the St. Louis Jewish Sports Hall of Fame.

See also
List of select Jewish football players

References

External links
Official website

1960 births
Living people
American football offensive linemen
Missouri Tigers football players
Jewish American sportspeople
New Orleans Saints players
National Conference Pro Bowl players
University of Missouri alumni
21st-century American Jews
Ed Block Courage Award recipients